Salon-de-Provence, commonly known as Salon, is a commune located about  northwest of Marseille in the Bouches-du-Rhône department, region of Provence-Alpes-Côte d'Azur, Southern France. It is the home of an important French Air and Space Force (Armée de l'Air et de l'Espace) air base. In 2017, it had a population of 45,528.

History
Salon was a Gallo-Roman oppidum well positioned on the salt trade routes between Adriatic, Atlantic and Mediterranean seas, hence its name. This region was under the Phocaean influence since the sixth century BC, and stretches of the Via Aurelia can still be recognized just outside the town, but the earliest mention of the place under its familiar name is of the ninth century, as Villa Salone. The archbishops of Arles controlled the site.

Its principal claim to fame today is as the place where Nostradamus spent his last years and is buried. His dwelling is maintained as a museum, and for four days every June or July, the city celebrates its history during the time of Nostradamus, attracting tourists.

The historic center still lies within its circuit of walls, entered through two seventeenth-century gateways, the Porte de l'Horloge and the Port Bourg Neuf.

In 1559 the engineer  Adam de Craponne opened the Canal de Craponne to bring fresh water from the river Durance to the town and the surrounding plain of Crau. Inexpensive freight brought commerce to Salon, and the town prospered.

Sights

Château de l'Emperi

The castle, which was the biggest in Provence during the 12th and 13th centuries and was mentioned as early as the tenth, still dominates the old town. It was the preferred residence of the bishops of Arles, when Provence was part of the Holy Roman Empire, hence its name. It became the property of the city after the French Revolution. After damage caused by the 1909 earthquake, it has been restored and now hosts a museum of military history. Every summer, it hosts an international classical music festival.

Fontaine Moussue
The fountain in Place Crousillat has existed since the 16th century. During the 20th century, limestone concretions and vegetation developed, giving the familiar mushroom aspect.

St Michel Chapel
Built during the 13th century, this chapel boasts a remarkable Romanesque tympanum featuring the paschal lamb.

Collégiale Saint Laurent
The current edifice was erected during 15th century by Cardinal Louis Aleman, who was then bishop of Arles.

Salon-de-Provence Air Base
Salon-de-Provence Air Base is the site of the French Air Force Academy, as well as the home of the French Aerial Demonstration team, the Patrouille de France.

Market
Every Wednesday the Place Morgan is host to a Provençal market.

Culture 
Each summer, the Château de l'Empéri hosts a festival of chamber music.

Some years the Château is the venue for Nostradamiques – an historical re-enactment of the time of Nostradamus which includes processions and a transformation of the old medieval downtown. One such re-enactment was performed by the television presenter Jean-Pierre Foucault. In 2006 Robert Hossein compered the closing ceremony of the re-enactment.

Personalities
 Abba Mari ben Eligdor (fl.1335), distinguished Talmudist, philosopher, resident 14th Century
 Nostradamus (1503–1566), resident 1547–66, place of death
 Miquèu Tronc (16th century), Occitan language writer
 Jean Baptiste Christophore Fusée Aublet (1720–1778), French botanist and explorer, birthplace
 Joan Montseny (1864-1942), Catalan anarchist, place of death
 Charles Trenet (1913-2001), French singer, resident for military reasons, 1939–1940
 Romain Gary (1914–1980), French novelist and pilot, learnt to fly with military in Salon-de-Provence before Nazi occupation of France
 Patrick Baudry (1946-), and Léopold Eyharts (1957-), French astronauts, military training
 Daniel Goossens (1954-), Cartoonist, birthplace
 Christine Boisson (1956-), French actor, birthplace
 Franck Esposito (1971-), French swimmer, birthplace
 Michaël N'dri (1984-), footballer, birthplace and early Football career
Simon Porte Jacquemus (1990-), Fashion Designer
 Nassourdine Imavov, MMA fighter, former resident

Twin towns – sister cities
Salon-de-Provence is twinned with:
 Blanzy-la-Salonnaise, France
 Aranda de Duero, Spain
 Gubbio, Italy
 Huntingdon, England, United Kingdom
 Godmanchester, England, United Kingdom
 Szentendre, Hungary
 Wertheim am Main, Germany

Gallery

Population

Climate

See also
 Communes of the Bouches-du-Rhône department

References

External links

 Official website
 International Salon-de-Provence Music Festival : 'Musique à l'Emperi'

Communes of Bouches-du-Rhône
Nostradamus
Bouches-du-Rhône communes articles needing translation from French Wikipedia